The mid front rounded vowel is a type of vowel sound, used in some spoken languages.

Although there is no dedicated symbol in the International Phonetic Alphabet that represents the "exact" mid front rounded vowel between close-mid  and open-mid ,  is generally used.

Mid front compressed vowel 
This article uses the first symbol for simplicity. There is no dedicated diacritic for compression in the IPA. However, the compression of the lips can be shown with the letter  as  /  (simultaneous  /  and labial compression) or  /  ( /  modified with labial compression). The spread-lip diacritic  may also be used with a rounded vowel letters  /  as an ad hoc symbol, though technically 'spread' means unrounded.

Features

Occurrence 
Because front rounded vowels are assumed to have compression, and few descriptions cover the distinction, some of the following may actually have protrusion.

Mid front protruded vowel 

Catford notes that most languages with rounded front and back vowels use distinct types of labialization, protruded back vowels and compressed front vowels. However, a few languages, such as Scandinavian ones, have protruded front vowels. One of these, Swedish, even contrasts the two types of rounding in front vowels (see near-close near-front rounded vowel, with Swedish examples of both types of rounding).

As there are no diacritics in the IPA to distinguish protruded and compressed rounding,  (a mid front rounded vowel modified by endolabialization) will be used here as an ad hoc symbol for protruded mid front vowels.

Acoustically, this sound is "between" the more typical compressed mid front vowel  and the unrounded mid front vowel .

Features

Occurrence

Notes

References

External links
 

Mid vowels
Front vowels
Rounded vowels

pl:Samogłoska półprzymknięta przednia zaokrąglona